The Río Cuarto craters are a purported group of impact craters located in Córdoba Province, Argentina. Research published in 2002 indicates that they are more likely a result of aeolian processes.

Discovery 
In 1990, Captain Ruben Lianza of the Argentine Air Force, an amateur astronomer, provided a report to an astronomy publication that included aerial pictures of a set of odd teardrop-shaped depressions near the city of Río Cuarto, Córdoba in north-central Argentina. The depressions seemed very similar to the sets of craters produced in laboratory simulations of impacts taking place at low angles. Such features exist on the Moon, Mars, and Venus, but had not been seen on Earth up to that time.

The depressions had long been known to Argentine geologists, but until Lianza, nobody had seriously investigated them. Samples of materials obtained from the depressions indicated the presence of shocked materials, as well as pebbles that were clearly of meteoritic origin . A team of American researchers went to Argentina to investigate, collaborating with Captain Lianza and Argentine academics to study the strange depressions.

There were ten depressions, four of them of substantial size. Another major depression, the "Northern Basin", about half and again as big as one of the Twins, was sited 11 kilometers further to the northeast. The long axes of the depressions all point to the northeast.

Impact origin theory 
The depressions were thought to be due to a grazing impact of a set of objects at a very low angle, which calculations show to be a rare occurrence. Most impacts will strike at an angle of 45 degrees to the horizontal or greater, and the impact craters will always be close to circular, since the shock wave that results from the impact propagates symmetrically.

A grazing impact, however, will form an elliptical crater, with sprays of debris that look like butterfly wings. This has been confirmed by high-velocity guns used for impact experiments, and more recently by computer simulations. On impact, the object may shed chunks of itself that fly further downrange to perform secondary impacts.

Based upon physical and numerical modeling, proponents of the Río Cuarto event suggest that the object struck at an angle of no more than 15 degrees from the horizontal, with the impact itself having 10 times more explosive energy than the Barringer Crater event and 30 times more than the Tunguska event. Although the age of the depressions has not yet been determined precisely, it is believed by some researchers they are about 10,000 years old, placing them at the start of the Holocene, though the EID gives a broader age of less than 100,000 years old.

Aeolian origin theory 
Satellite surveys of the area have found more than 400 similar oval features in the area, and studies of the layers of rock show no evidence of raised rims. These studies point to the oval features as being dune formations, aligned to the prevailing northeast wind.

There is no doubt that there is impact material in the form of glassy impactite and shocked quartz in the Río Cuarto structures. The age of this material has been questioned, and estimated to more than 500,000 BP, from an unknown source crater. There may have been a second, more recent event at around 10,000 BP which produced a second layer of impactite glass.

References

Bibliography 
 
 
 

Impact craters of Argentina
Pleistocene impact craters
Holocene impact craters
Pleistocene Argentina
Geology of Córdoba Province, Argentina
Landforms of Córdoba Province, Argentina